Elaphriella opalina is a species of small sea snail, a marine gastropod mollusk in the family Solariellidae.

Description
The size of the shell attains 15 mm.

Distribution
This marine species occurs off South Africa.

References

 Higo, S., Callomon, P. & Goto, Y. (1999). Catalogue and bibliography of the marine shell-bearing Mollusca of Japan. Osaka. : Elle Scientific Publications. 749 pp

External links
 Shikama T. (1977). Descriptions of new and noteworthy Gastropoda from western Pacific and Indian Oceans. Science Reports of the Yokohama National University, section II (Geology). 24: 1-23, 5 pls
 Williams S.T., Kano Y., Warén A. & Herbert D.G. (2020). Marrying molecules and morphology: first steps towards a reevaluation of solariellid genera (Gastropoda: Trochoidea) in the light of molecular phylogenetic studies. Journal of Molluscan Studies. 86(1): 1–26

opalina
Gastropods described in 1977